Kashan County is in Isfahan province, Iran. The capital of the county is the city of Kashan. At the 2006 census, the county's population was 297,000 in 81,816 households. The following census in 2011 counted 323,371 people in 95,260 households. At the 2016 census, the county's population was 364,482 in 112,258 households.

Administrative divisions

The population history and structural changes of Kashan County's administrative divisions over three consecutive censuses are shown in the following table. The latest census shows four districts, nine rural districts, and seven cities.

Geography 
To the north is Qom, to the east is Aran va Bidgol, the desert, and the Salt lake, to the south is Isfahan, and to the west is Ghamsar and the Karkas Mountains.

The rivers flowing from the mountains to the desert are small and temporary. The most important is Šāh-āb, originating in Qohrud. Irrigation is mainly dependent on subterranean channels, and the water is slightly salty. There are also several springs, the most notable of which is the Fin water source.

History
The etymology of the city's name comes from Kasian, the original inhabitants of the city, whose remains are found at Tapeh Sialk dating back 9,000 years; later this changed to Kashian, hence the town name. Between the 12th and the 14th centuries, Kashan was an important centre for the production of high quality pottery and tiles. In modern Persian, the word for a tile (kashi) comes from the name of the town.

Archeological discoveries in the Sialk Hillocks, which lie 4 km west of Kashan, reveal that this region was one of the primary centers of civilization in pre-historic ages. Kashan dates back to the Elamite period of Iran. The Sialk ziggurat still stands today in the suburbs of Kashan after 7,000 years. 

The artifacts uncovered at Sialk reside in the Louvre in Paris, the New York Metropolitan Museum of Art, and Iran's National Museum.

By some accounts, although not all, Kashan was the origin of the three wise men who followed the star that guided them to Bethlehem to witness the nativity of Jesus, as recounted in the Bible. Whatever the historical validity of this story, the attribution of Kashan as their original home testifies to the city's prestige at the time the story was set down. 

According to a legend dating from the Safavid era, Abu Lu'lu'a, the Persian skilled craftsman who was enslaved by the Islamic conquerors and who eventually assassinated the caliph Umar ibn al-Khattab in 644, fled to Kashan after the assassination. The shrine that was built over his supposed tomb is one of Kashan's notable landmarks. 

Sultan Malik Shah I of the Seljuk dynasty ordered the building of a fortress in the middle of Kashan in the 11th century. The fortress walls, called Ghal'eh Jalali still stand today in central Kashan.

Kashan was also a leisure vacation spot for Safavi Kings. Bagh-e Fin (Fin Garden), specifically, is one of the most famous gardens in Iran. This beautiful garden with its pool and orchards was designed for Shah Abbas I as a classical Persian vision of paradise. The original Safavid buildings have been substantially replaced and rebuilt by the Qajar dynasty although the layout of trees and marble basins is close to the original. The garden itself however, was first founded 7,000 years ago alongside the Cheshmeh-ye-Soleiman. The garden is also notorious as the site of the murder of Mirza Taghi Khan known as Amir Kabir, chancellor of Nasser-al-Din Shah, Iran's King in 1852.

The earthquake of 1778 leveled the city of Kashan and all the edifices of Shah Abbas Safavi, leaving 8,000 casualties. But the city started afresh and has today become a focal tourist attraction due to the numerous large houses from the 18th and 19th centuries, illustrating the finest examples of Qajari aesthetics.

Tourism 
Kashan has many tourist locations. 
Fin Garden to west of Kashan, at end of Amir kabir road (fin road), is an old and beautiful garden from 300 years ago. The garden has a museum and a bath. In the museum you can find many ancient tools from 3,000 years ago. Amir Kabir, the chief minister to Naser al-Din Shah Qajar (Shah of Persia), was killed 200 years ago in the bath.
The ancient Tepe Sialk (or Sialk hill) ziggurat is on Amir Kabir road and tourists can visit this ancient hill that was used 3,500 years ago.
Ancient houses are located in the Soltan Mir Ahmad neighborhood in Alavi Street. In this neighborhood you can find many ancient houses from 300 years ago.
The desert to the east of city is a beautiful place for people that like deserts and salt lakes. If you plan on going to Maranjab Kavir and the salt lake beach, you can go to Aran va bidgol town, and then continue to the salt lake beach and Maranjab Inn.
The Karkas mountains are located behind the Fin Garden and the Tehran-Isfahan Highway.

The most important Kashan souvenirs are cotton candy, pancakes, sesame, and rosewater.

Kashan County today

Although there are many sites in Kashan of potential interest to tourists, the city remains largely undeveloped in this sector, with fewer than a thousand foreign tourists per year. Qamsar and Abyaneh are notable towns around Kashan, which attract tourists all year around. The nearby town of Niasar features a man-made cave and fireplace of historical interest.

Kashan is internationally famous for manufacturing carpets, silk and other textiles. Kashan today houses most of Iran's mechanized carpet-weaving factories, and has an active marble and copper mining industry.

Ghaleh Jalali is not located in the centre of kashan. It is located on the edge of souther margin of the old wall of the city. As a matter of fact, the southern part of the wall and the Ghaleh (the citadel) join up and forms just one piece.
Areas outside the wall used to be simply irrigated farm lands, but today is sporadically residential.

Main sights

Kashan's architectural sights include:

 Agha Bozorg Mosque
 Āmeri House
 Boroujerdi House
 Jalali castle
 Tabātabāei House
 Abbāsi House
 Attarha House
 Al-e Yaseen House
 Sultan Amir shrine and bath
 40 Dokhtaran Fortress
 Shrine of Abu Lu'lu'a, the assassin of the second caliph Umar ibn al-Khattab
 Fin Garden
 Sialk ziggurat
 Ghal'eh jalali
 Kashan Bazaar
 Timcheh Amin-o-dowleh

Education

Colleges and universities in Kashan include:
Kashan University of Medical Sciences
Islamic Azad University of Kashan
University of Kashan

Transportation

Road 71
Freeway 7, located near the city

Kashan is connected via freeways to Isfahan and Natanz to the South, and Qom, which is an hour drive away to the north.

Notable people
Sohrab Sepehri
Ghyath ad-Din Jamshid Kashani
Kamal-ol-Molk
Mohammad-Nabi Sarbolouki
Ustad Ali Maryam
Muhsen Feyz Kashani
Yedidia Shofet, Former chief rabbi of Iran and the worldwide spiritual leader of Persian Jewry.
Uriel Davidi, Former chief rabbi of Iran and the worldwide spiritual leader of Persian Jewry.
Isaac Larian, Chief Executive Officer of MGA Entertainment
David Alliance, Baron Alliance, Businessman and a Liberal Democrat politician in the United Kingdom.
Seyyed Hossein Nasr, Leading Islamic Philosopher and exponent of the Perennial Philosophy

Sister cities

 Umeå, Sweden
 Kazanlak, Bulgaria
 Sabzevar, Iran

See also
Iranian Architecture
Kashan rug
List of the historical structures in the Isfahan province
Sialk - Kashan's ancient architecture.
Traditional Persian residential architecture

References

 

Counties of Isfahan Province